The men's 200 metres at the 1950 European Athletics Championships was held in Brussels, Belgium, at Heysel Stadium on 25, 26 and 27 August 1950.

Medalists

Results

Final
27 August
Wind: -0.7 m/s

Semi-finals
26 August

Semi-final 1
Wind: 0.6m/s

Semi-final 2
Wind: NWI

Heats
25 August

Heat 1
Wind: 0.2m/s

Heat 2
Wind: 0m/s

Heat 3
Wind: 0m/s

Heat 4
Wind: 0.7m/s

Heat 5
Wind: 0.2m/s

Heat 6
Wind: 0.4m/s

Participation
According to an unofficial count, 25 athletes from 16 countries participated in the event.

 (2)
 (1)
 (2)
 (2)
 (1)
 (1)
 (2)
 (2)
 (1)
 (2)
 (1)
 (2)
 (1)
 (2)
 (2)
 (1)

References

200 metres
200 metres at the European Athletics Championships